Body Image is a quarterly peer-reviewed academic journal covering the study of body image as it pertains to psychology and other disciplines. It was established in 2004 and is published by Elsevier. The editor-in-chief is Tracy L. Tylka (Ohio State University).

Abstracting and indexing
The journal is abstracted and indexed in:

According to the Journal Citation Reports, the journal has a 2021 impact factor of 5.580. The journal exhibited unusual levels of self-citation and its 2019 journal impact factor was suspended from the Journal Citation Reports in 2020, a sanction which hit 34 journals in total.

References

External links

Publications established in 2004
Quarterly journals
Elsevier academic journals
English-language journals
Psychology journals